Tverrbreen is a glacier in Wedel Jarlsberg Land at Spitsbergen, Svalbard. It has a length of about seven kilometers, and is a tributary to Recherchebreen.

References

Glaciers of Spitsbergen